John Racener (born December 17, 1985) is an American poker professional from Port Richey, Florida, best known as the runner-up of the Main Event at the 2010 World Series of Poker. He has made World Series of Poker final tables on 18 occasions, as well as one World Poker Tour final table.

Racener won his first WSOP bracelet in 2017, capturing the $10,000 Dealers Choice Championship for $273,962. He also had 17 cashes in 2017 which is a joint record with Chris Ferguson.

As of 2021, his live tournament winnings exceed $10,175,000, the majority of which comes from his $5.5 million second place prize at the 2010 Main Event.

World Series of Poker bracelets

References

1985 births
American poker players
World Series of Poker bracelet winners
Living people
People from Tampa, Florida